The Red Sea Trading Corporation (commonly known as 09) is the commercial entity created to enact the People's Front for Democracy and Justice's socially responsible development program. The company was founded with $20,000 in 1984. It is primarily involved in international trade and is the largest importer in the country.

The head of the organization is Hagos Gebrehiwot.

The company grew out of the necessity for the Eritrean People's Liberation Front to commercially develop the territory that it had captured during the Eritrean War of Independence. Its guiding mission is closely related to the related Nakfa Corporation.

References

Companies of Eritrea
People's Front for Democracy and Justice
Organisations based in Asmara
Specially Designated Nationals and Blocked Persons List